Free ports in the United Kingdom are a series of government assigned special economic zones where customs rules such as taxes do not apply until goods leave the specified zone. The theoretical purpose of such free ports is to encourage economic activity in the surrounding area and increase manufacturing. Critics of such schemes, including the parliamentary opposition, see them as possible tax havens and open to money laundering.

The first free ports in the United Kingdom opened in the 1980s under Margaret Thatcher, as an attempt to combat de-industrialisation and a declining economy. Several free ports operated throughout the United Kingdom, however by 2012 the Conservative-led government decided not to renew their licences.

As part of the 2021 United Kingdom budget, Chancellor of the Exchequer Rishi Sunak announced that eight new free ports would be created. They are East Midlands Airport, Felixstowe and Harwich, Humber region, Liverpool City Region, Plymouth, Solent, Thames and Teesside.

History 
In their 1983 manifesto, The Challenge of Our Times, the Conservative government outlined its plans to establish 'experimental' free ports as a part of its regional policies to modernise the British economy following the early 1980s recession. After winning a second term at the general election Margaret Thatcher's government assigned free port status to six areas; namely Belfast, Birmingham, Cardiff, Liverpool, Glasgow Prestwick Airport and Southampton. These free ports experienced limited success during their lifetime and by 2012 Prime Minister David Cameron decided not to renew the free port licences. One Teesside MP blamed the failed experiment on "an uncharacteristic lack of ambition by the Thatcher Government" and "the regulatory constraints placed on them by the EU".

In 2016, the then backbench MP—and later Chancellor of the Exchequer—Rishi Sunak published a white paper for the Centre for Policy Studies outlining his ideas for post-Brexit free ports similar to those in the United States. The paper titled The Free Ports Opportunity suggested that creation of such ports could create 86,000 jobs and help fuel the Northern Powerhouse by bringing increased trade to deprived areas. After the Conservative Party's victory in the 2019 general election, plans were announced for ten free ports to be set up by 2021 with regions bidding for free status. Up to 40 bids for free port status were received during the process.

21st century
During the 2021 United Kingdom budget, Chancellor of the Exchequer, Rishi Sunak announced that eight new free ports would be created.

Other countries in the United Kingdom have also floated ideas for freeports. The Scottish government announced plans for so called sustainable "green ports", the Welsh government said it would continue providing it received the same level of funding as England and the Northern Ireland Executive said it was working with the HM Treasury to implement its own version.

Criticism 
Proposal for free ports in the United Kingdom have been heavily criticised by opposition parties, trade unions, think tanks and various economists. Reasons for this include the possibility for use as tax havens, smuggling and a way to erode worker's rights.

Despite claims of a cross party consensus, Labour Party members showed opposition to the idea with a speaker at a Labour conference describing them as "job-destroying". Further to this, Labour party leader Keir Starmer called it "giving up" and "blind faith". Former Shadow Chancellor of the Exchequer John McDonnell suggested it to be '"a revival of a failed Thatcherite plan from the 1980s, designed to cut away at regulation and our tax base."

At a Liberal Democrat conference in 2019, members passed a motion for the abolition of free ports due to the increased risk of money-laundering and tax evasion. Similarly the then Home Affairs spokesperson—and later leader— Sir Ed Davey suggested the UK could become the world capital of money laundering.

In Scotland, the Scottish National Party (SNP) was sceptical, with trade minister Ivan McKee calling them a "shiny squirrel" to distract from the consequences of Brexit. adding "the reputation of freeports across the world is mixed, with concerns about deregulation and risks of criminality, tax evasion and reductions in workers’ rights".  First Minister Nicola Sturgeon also raised concern over them being "low-cost, low-wage, low-value opportunities".  Despite these remarks, in 2021 the SNP announced its own version of free ports, called 'green ports', which they say will adopt "best practice which helps deliver our net-zero emissions and fair work principles, alongside supporting regeneration and innovation ambitions".

References 

Special economic zones
Foreign trade of the United Kingdom